Durga Puja in Kolkata is an annual festival celebrated in September or October. It marks the worship of the Hindu mother goddess Durga. This festival is the biggest festival and the biggest religious festival of Bengalis in Kolkata, the capital of West Bengal. Also, It is the biggest religious festival of Bengali Hindus or Hindus in Kolkata.

There are about 3,000 Barowari pujas in Kolkata. More than 200 pujas are organized in the city with a huge budget (crores of rupees).

Durga Puja in Kolkata has been inscribed on the list of 'Intangible Cultural Heritage of Humanity' by The United Nations Educational, Scientific and Cultural Organization - UNESCO in December of 2021.

History

Beginning

Since 1610, the Sabarna Roy Choudhury family has been organizing Durga Puja at their original residence in Barisha, Kolkata. This is probably the oldest Durga Puja festival in Kolkata. Nabakrishna Dev started Durga Puja at Shobhabazar Rajbari in 1757.

Barowari Durga Puja began in Kolkata in the early part of the twentieth century. Barwari Durga Puja quickly became a common people's festival in Kolkata. Earlier, Durga Puja in Kolkata was confined to wealthy families. In 1910, the first Barowari Durga Puja in Kolkata was organized by "Bhowanipore Sanatan Dharmatsahini Sabha" at Balram Basu Ghat Road, Bhowanipore.

Since 1985, the Asian Paints Authority has introduced the practice of awarding the Durga Puja Committees of Kolkata. This award is called the Asian Paints Sharad Shamman. Later many other commercial organizations introduced "Sharad Samman" or Durga Puja awards for Durga Puja in Kolkata.

The Government of West Bengal introduced Biswa Bangla Sharad Samman in 2013.

Expansion
Reports in the Yugantar and Anandabazar Patrika provide a rough estimate of Sarbojanin (public) puja expenditure since the 1950s. In 1957, each community spent an average of ₹8,000 to ₹12,000 rupees at that time, the combined cost of the pujas was about ₹25 lakhs were; in 1984, that total increased to approximately ₹2 crores.

A Times of India report of 2012 provided a statistic on the expenditure on Durga puja in Kolkata during that season. According to the report, a total of ₹123.05 crores was spent on 3,577 pujas in Kolkata.

Durga puja carnival 
Durga Puja Carnival started in Kolkata in 2016. The carnival was not organized in 2020 and 2021 due to covid-19 pandemic. It was again organized from 2022.

Recognition of UNESCO 
In 2019, Tapati Guha-Thakurta was entrusted with the task of preparing a dossier by the Indian Ministry of Culture. The dossier was submitted to UNESCO for the inclusion of Durga Puja in the UNESCO Representative List of the Intangible Cultural Heritage of Humanity. Representatives from various countries around the world evaluated the dossier at the 16th session, which began in Paris on 13 December 2021. "Durga Puja in Kolkata" gets Intangible Cultural Heritage status on 15 December 2021.

Puja: the festival

Durga Puja is mainly celebrated for 5 days - Shashti, Saptami, Ashtami, Navami and Dasami. But the festive mood around Durga Puja in Kolkata starts before Shashti, mainly from Mahalaya. Durga Puja pandals are opened to the public from the day of Mahalaya. The main attractions of Durga Puja in Kolkata are the decorations, sculptures, pandals, lights and illuminations, and carnival.

Economy
A study - Mapping the Creative Economy around the Durga Puja - has been commissioned by the British Council on behalf of the Department of Tourism, Government of West Bengal. In 2021, the British Council in India mapped the creative economy of Durga Puja at ₹32,000 crores for the year 2019 and added that the festival contributed 2.58% of the GDP of West Bengal in fiscal year 2019-2020. "Durga Puja in Kolkata" contributes to a large part of this creative economy.

The economy of Durga Puja in Kolkata is divided into various sectors. Major among the various economic sectors are installation, art and decoration, Idol making, lighting and illumination, literature and publishing, sponsorship, advertising, retail, crafts and design (Puja Utensils), film and entertainment, and food and beverage. In 2019, Kolkata accounts for 15% share of padal-making (installation, art and decoration) industry of West Bengal, worth ₹129 crores. Both the idol making industry and the lighting and lighting industry contributed ₹120 crores to Durga puja in Kolkata.

References

 
Bengali festivals
Festivals in West Bengal
Culture of Kolkata
Masterpieces of the Oral and Intangible Heritage of Humanity